John Derrick may refer to:

John Derrick (coroner) (born c. 1538), noted for the first historic mention of the sport of cricket
John Derrick (footballer) (1891–1938), English footballer
John Derrick (cricketer) (1963–2017), Welsh cricketer

See also
John Derricke (fl. 1578–1581), English writer and artist
John Derek (1926–1998), American actor, director and photographer